Meghna Heli Bridge, codenamed Operation Cactus Lilly, was an aerial operation of the Indian Air Force during the Indo-Pakistani War of 1971, commencing India's involvement in Bangladesh Liberation War. It took place on 9 December, when the Indian Air Force (IAF) airlifted the IV Corps of the Indian Army and Mukti Bahini fighters from Brahmanbaria to Raipura in Narsingdi over the River Meghna, bypassing the destroyed Meghna Bridge and Pakistani defences in Ashuganj.

Operation
When the war broke out, IV corps  went into action in the Agartala sector. At the start of the Dhaka Campaign, Dhaka was set as an objective for II Corps and IV Corps  had been tasked to capture the fortress of Comilla. By 8 December, troops of the 57 Mountain Division and the IV Corps had already achieved their initial objectives of occupying the territory leading up to the Meghna. The only way across the river was over the Ashuganj Bridge, which very soon became a fortress where a Pakistani division had consolidated itself. The strategic importance of breaking down resistance at Ashuganj soon became apparent to Lt Gen Sagat Singh, leading the IV Corps, who realised that his troops could, with a push, threaten Dhaka. Once a significant force had been built up, there was no recognisable enemy force between the helidropped force and Dhaka. Ashuganj Bridge was the only bridge that spanned the huge Meghna River which at its narrowest point was more than 4,000 yards wide. With his troops at Ashuganj, Singh however, realised his formation would be joining in the race to Dhaka. As would later turn out, II Corps was held at Kushtia by Pakistani defences and did not make it to Dhaka. 

However, Aerial photos also showed that the bridge had been destroyed and it would require the Army Engineers to construct a new bridge over the sprawling Meghna for Indian troops to advance. Anticipating high casualties in the attempt to take the bridge by force, Singh, along with Maj Gen B F Gonsalves, leading the 57 Mtn Div, made the decision to airlift the troops.

Brilliant in its conception, the idea was fraught with risks and dangers. The move had to go un-opposed, or at the worse, face minimal opposition from Pakistani troops north of Raipura. The Indian troops that were helidropped did not have artillery or armoured support. On the 9th, troops began to be airlifted to Raipura, south of the Ashuganj Bridge. Once this position was consolidated, the troops were to be airlifted to Narsingdi. From Narsingdi the road to Dhaka would lie bare for IV Corps to take. To provide support for the heliborne troops, PT-76 Tanks were told to ford the Meghna River.

The IAF's operation was led by Group Captain Chandan Singh and utilised Mi-4 helicopters that had already been involved in the Sylhet air-lift on the night of 7 December. Through the night of 9 December, the IAF air-lifted the entire 311 Brigade. The first troops, numbering around six hundred were landed through the night of the 9th, immediately making contact with Pakistani troops north of Raipura. They however held their positions, with the IAF flying in reinforcements. Over the next 36 hours, over 110 sorties were flown. The Mi-4, which normally carried 14 troops, carried as many as 23 on board. The troops were initially airlifted to Raipura, south of the Ashuganj Bridge. At the same time as this operation was on, 73rd Brigade moved across Meghna on boats and riverine crafts.

After consolidating their positions at Raipura, the troops were helilifted to Narsingdi. After securing Narshingdi, Indian forces captured Daudkandi and Baidder Bazar on 14 and 15 December respectively, both with helicopter assault. From Narshingdi, the metalled road to Dhaka lay undefended for IV Corps to take.

Aftermath
The Pakistani Army had left the roads to Dhaka undefended moving their defences at the bridge-heads and defensive strong-points, expecting to hold the Indian Army at these positions long enough till the UN and international pressure halted the Indian advance. The Meghna Helibridge along with the Tangail Airdrop on  11 December ensured that these positions were by-passed, capturing the approaches to Dhaka. Moreover, the Pakistani garrison at Ashuganj was effectively put under siege, facing the Indian Army at Brahmanbaria and at Raipura. The Tangail Airdrop a day later denied the Pakistani 93 Brigade the sanctuary of Dhaka. Dhaka now could only be defended by troops within the city.

Popular culture
Hindustan Ki Kasam a Hindi war movie directed by Chetan Anand and released in 1973  was based on the incidents of  Operation Cactus Lilly.

See also
 Timeline of the Bangladesh Liberation War
 Military plans of the Bangladesh Liberation War
 Mitro Bahini order of battle
 Pakistan Army order of battle, December 1971
 Evolution of Pakistan Eastern Command plan
 1971 Bangladesh genocide
 Operation Searchlight
 Indo-Pakistani wars and conflicts

References

Brahmanbaria District
Narsingdi District
Battles of Indo-Pakistani wars
Battles of the Bangladesh Liberation War
History of the Indian Air Force
Indo-Pakistani War of 1971
December 1971 events in Asia